Lewis Girls' Comprehensive School is a secondary school in Wales. The Lewis Girls School stands at the border between Glamorganshire and Monmouthshire divided by the Rhymney River which act as the school fields boundary. The School was established subsequent to its partner school, Lewis Boys School, situated in Pengam. The origins of the schools come from the bequest of Sir Edward Lewis to set up the Boys school, as Girls became pupils and numbers swelled the division and separate educational provision evolved. In 1973 the school amalgamated with the Ystrad Mynach Secondary School for Girls to form the present comprehensive school in Ystrad Mynach, Wales. The Ystrad Mynach School, built in the late 1950s was primarily established for female students but has recently begun to allow male students from local comprehensive schools to enroll in its sixth form and study subjects under Lewis Girls' teaching staff.

References

Secondary schools in Caerphilly County Borough
Girls' schools in Wales